Battle of Krivasoo (November 18, 1919 - December 30, 1919) took place near the Krivasoo, Estonia during the Estonian War of Independence between the Estonian Army and the Red Army.

References 

Battles of the Estonian War of Independence
Ida-Viru County
1919 in Estonia
November 1919 events
December 1919 events